The Zlín Z 42 is a single-engine two-seat Czechoslovakian trainer aircraft manufactured by Moravan Otrokovice. A developed version, the Z 142, is the most popular aircraft variant in the manufacturer's aircraft line.

Design and development

The aircraft were built by Moravan Aviation, founded in 1934 by Tomáš Baťa in Czechoslovakia.

As a follow-on and replacement for the successful Zlín Trener series of tandem aerobatic trainers, Moravan developed a new family of light aircraft, featuring a side-by-side seat layout, and comprising a two-seat trainer, the Zlín Z 42 and a four-seat trainer/tourer aircraft, the Zlín Z 43. The Z 42 first flew on 17 October 1967, achieving airworthiness certification on 7 September 1970.

The aircraft fuselage center section is of welded steel tube, covered with sheet metal and fiberglass panels.  The tailcone is of monocoque construction.  The empennage is of sheet metal. The two-spar wings are of all-metal construction.  The tricycle landing gear is fixed, with a steerable nosewheel.  Designed for aerobatics instruction, it was certified to +6.0 and -4.0 limit maneuvering load factors, and was equipped with full inverted fuel and oil systems, permitting extended inverted flight.  The Z 42 is powered by a Walter inverted six-cylinder engine rated at 134 kW (180 hp).

The revised Zlín Z 42M flew in November 1972, with a revised tail taken from the Z 43, and a Constant speed propeller replacing the variable pitch propeller (where the propeller pitch is controlled by the pilot) of the original Z 42.  When early Z 42s were refitted with the new propeller, they were redesignated Z 42 MU.

Development continued, with the Zlín Z 142, featuring a slightly enlarged two-seat airframe based on that of the Z 42 and the more powerful (157 kW (210 hp)) Walter (now LOM) M 337  fuel-injected inverted six-cylinder, supercharged air-cooled engine of the Z 43 replacing the unsupercharged LOM M137 engine of the Z 42. The prototype Z-142 first flew on 29 December 1978.

In the late 1980s, further development work was initiated.  The inverted inline engine was replaced with a four-cylinder horizontally-opposed Lycoming IO-360 engine.  This variant is designated the Z 242L Guru, and is immediately distinguishable by its relatively wide cowling which houses the flat-four engine.

in 2021 Zlin introduced a revised 242L called the Zeus. This has a less angular tail and more streamlined cockpit plus undercarriage revisions.

Fernas 142
Licence production of the Z 142 has been carried out in Algeria by ECA Fernas (sometimes known as just Fernas) as the ECA-Fernas 142, complete with aerobatic modifications.

Operational history
Two Z-142s were used by the Liberation Tigers of Tamil Eelam in bombing sorties on the Sri Lankan airforce bases in Sri Lanka in 2007. In October 2008 the Zlíns were also used in an attack on a military base of the Sri Lanka Army, and a power station on the outskirts of the city of Colombo, Sri Lanka.

Variants
Zlín Z 42
Zlín Z 42M
Zlín Z 142

Zlín Z 242  
Zlín Z 242L Guru
Zlín Z 242L Zeus
Fernas 142 / ECA Fernas 142 (ECA - Entreprise de construction aéronautique) Algerian licence production of the Z 142, first flown in 1993.

Operators

Civilian
The aircraft is popular with flying training organizations. 

 Government Flying Service

Military

 
Algerian Air Force - producing locally under Fernas-142 name 

 
ADF - Australian Air Force Cadets - three in service used to train cadet pilots as of 2017

 
Bolivian Air Force = nine x Z242L ordered in May 2016.
 
Bulgarian Air Force - Z 42

Cuban Air Force - Z-142

Croatian Air Force and Air Defence - Z-242L

Czech Air Force - Z-142

Hungarian Air Force - Z-242L 

North Macedonia Air Brigade - Z-242L

Mexican Navy - Z-242

Peruvian Air Force - Z-242

Slovenian Air Force and Air Defence - Z-242

Yemen Air Force - Z-242.
Separatist organizations
 Liberation Tigers of Tamil Eelam - Air Tigers (formerly active in )

Specifications (Zlin 42M)

References
Citations

Bibliography

  

 

Moravan official site. Accessed October 31, 2005.

External links

European Aviation Safety Agency (EASA) Type-Certificate Data Sheet

Aerobatic aircraft
1970s Czechoslovakian civil trainer aircraft
Zlín aircraft
Military equipment of Slovenia
Single-engined tractor aircraft
Low-wing aircraft
Aircraft first flown in 1967
1990s Algerian military trainer aircraft